Xenisthmus chi (Japan wriggler, chi xenisthmid) is a species of fish in the wriggler family, Xenisthmidae, which is regarded as a synonymous with the Eleotridae,. Japan wrigglers are tiny and clear. Before Paedocypris progenetica and the dwarf goby (Pandaka pygmaea) were discovered, the Japan wriggler was the smallest known fish.

Distribution
Southwest Pacific.

References

chi
Fish described in 2004